Reimsdyke was launched at Batavia in 1796. She was taken in prize in 1797 and became a West Indiaman. In 1801 she became a slave ship in the triangular trade in enslaved people. She made one complete voyage. In 1803 the Royal Navy captured her on her second voyage as she was sailing under the colours of the Batavian Republic and she was condemned in prize. She drifted out to sea after her capture and disappeared with over 200 slaves still aboard.

Possible origin
During the Quasi-War between France and the United States, Reimsdyke, of Providence, Rhode Island, Ahorn, master, was returning from Île de France when a French privateer captured her and took her into St Martin's. A British lugger cut her out and took Reimsdyke into Tortola.

On 9 February 1798, Reymsdyke, M'Clenahan, master, arrived at Gravesend from Martinique.

Career
Reimsdyke first appeared in Lloyd's Register (LR) as Reymsdyk, with origin India.

On 16 February 1800, Reimsdyke, Fry, master, came into Plymouth leaky. She was carrying a cargo from London to Demerara.

1st slave trading voyage (1801–1802): Reimsdyke sailed from London on 17 November 1801, bound for Africa. Lloyd's List also reported that Reimsdyke, Cooley, master was at Portsmouth on 1 December, having returned from Africa. The actual master was James McIver.

Reimsdyke started acquiring slaves on 25 January 1802, first at Cape Coast Castle, and then at Accra. She arrived at Demerara on 31 May with 274 slaves. She arrived back at London on 19 September, under the command of Captain Nox.

2nd slave trading voyage (1802–loss): Captain James McIver sailed from London on 21 December 1802. She sailed to Rotterdam with a cargo of sugar from London. At Rotterdam she took on four more crew members and trade goods and sailed for West Africa. She sailed during the Peace of Amiens so trading with The Netherlands was not an issue. Furthermore, Reimsdykes owner, Thomas King, also arranged for her nominal sale to two agents there. King had plantations in Demerara, which was a Dutch Colony and the authorities would not permit British ships to deliver slaves to the colony. King's nominal sale would permit Reimsdyke to sail under the Dutch flag and so deliver to his plantations the slaves that he would acquire in West Africa.

Reimsdyke started acquiring slaves on 24 February 1803 at Cape Coast Castle. Actually, she visited several ports on the coast. Ultimately, most of the slaves she carried came from Minerva, which was also owned by Henry King.

The Trans-Atlantic Slave Trade database reports that Reimsdykes subsequent fate is unknown. However, more is known.

Fate
On 30 August 1803 , under the command of Commander Peter Hunt, captured a Dutch ship, whose name was not recorded, that was carrying 410 slaves. Other records show that the vessel was Reimsdyke. Hornet took Reimsdyke to Kingstown, Saint Vincent, arriving there on 4 September. Adjudication of the prize did not begin until 28 October. Around the end of November, 60 or 70 enslaved people suffering from rheumatism from their long confinement on the vessel were sent ashore to recuperate before their sale. Some slaves had also died.

On 25 December Reimsdyke separated from her anchors and drifted out to sea. The schooner or sloop Hornet, Hamilton Woods, master, set out to find her. Woods succeeded in locating Reimsdyke and took off 115 slaves, all that Hornet could carry. Reimsdykes  subsequent fate is unknown. It was believed at the time that a French privateer may have taken her.

Reimsdyke was condemned in prize, but William King claimant of the ship and 376 slaves on behalf of Thomas King merchant of London, and for 24 slaves marked 13 on the arm, on behalf of John Blenkarne, chief of Dick's Cove, West Africa, a British subject, appealed the decision. It is the documents from the appeal that provide the most of the information about Reimsdykes last voyage. The Court rejected the appeal, ruling that ship and slaves were condemned as lawful prize to the Crown, i.e., HMS Hornet and Commander Hunt.

Notes

Citations

References
 
 
 
 

1796 ships
Age of Sail merchant ships of England
Slave ships
London slave ships
Captured ships
Missing ships